Lena Aronsohn (b. 1870) was reported to be an early figure in the American Jewish community's transition to accept women rabbis. Aronsohn was described in the American press as potentially becoming the first woman rabbi. She was a candidate the rabbinate at the same time as Ray Frank, however, neither Aronshon nor Frank completed their studies or received ordination.

Aronsohn was born in 1870 in Louisiana and her family soon moved to Marshall, Texas. In 1888 Aronsohn moved to Hot Springs, Arkansas where she worked as a music teacher in the local public schools. Aronsohn's mother died a few years later. In 1892 and 1893, Lena Aronsohn became the subject of several news stories concerning her intention to study to become a rabbi. The American press speculated that it was the death of Aronsohn's mother as well as financial hardship that led to the decision to pursue a rabbinical career. In early 1893, The American Israelite rejected the report as unfounded.

Aronsohn was also reported to deliver public lectures on Judaism to various Jewish congregations.

Gallery

See also 
 Hannah G. Solomon
 Ray Frank

References 

People from Marshall, Texas
People from Louisiana
People from Hot Springs, Arkansas
1870 births
Year of death missing